Grégoire Orlyk, also Hryhor Orlyk (November 5, 1702, Baturyn – November 14, 1759, Minden), was a French military commander, special envoy and member of Louis XV's secret intelligence service. Grégoire Orlyk was born in Ukraine, the son of Ukrainian hetman in exile Pylyp Orlyk and Hanna Hertsyk. He received a good education in Sweden, served in Poland and Saxony, and participated in the secret efforts of France to restore Stanisław Leszczyński to the Polish throne. He later commanded the king's regiment of Royal suedois. For his intelligence work and military exploits he was given the title of comte and promoted to the general's rank of Maréchal de camp. Grégoire Orlyk was an acquaintance of the French philosopher Voltaire, and championed the Ukrainian cause in France and other countries.

Background 

Hryhor Orlyk was born on November 5, 1702, in Baturyn, the capital of Cossack Hetmanate in the family of Cossacks' General scribe Pylyp Orlyk. The family was very well connected with the then hetman Ivan Mazepa, who became Hryhor's godfather. After Mazepa's defeat at Poltava in 1709 him and his allies, including the family of Pylyp Orlyk fled Ukraine for the Ottoman territory – Bendery, (present day Moldova), where Orlyk and his family together with other Ukrainian émigrés and the defeated Swedish king Charles XII had lived for five years. Upon Mazepa's death, Pylyp Orlyk was proclaimed the hetman of Ukraine in exile and by agreement between Tsardom of Russia and the Ottoman Empire in 1714 Charles XII and his allies were allowed safe passage to Sweden.

In Sweden the young Orlyk was signed up in the Swedish royal guard until in 1716 he began his studies at the Lund University. There he spent two years and received good education: studied music (and became a proficient lute player), philosophy and metaphysics, became fluent in Latin and several other European languages. After two more years in king's service in 1720 his father moved to Germany and took his son with him. There with the help of his father in 1721 he received a lieutenant's post in the cavalry guard of Saxony. His service there didn't last long, as in 1726 Russia demanded from Saxony his extradition and the young officer moved first to Austria and then to Poland, where he became an adjutant of the crown hetman. Eventually Orlyk allied himself with the pro-French party within the court that was trying to restore on the Polish throne Stanisław Leszczyński. Orlyk acted as a secret liaison between Joseph Poniatowski and the French ambassador in Warsaw.

In French secret service 

In 1729 Orlyk was entrusted with the mission to bring upon the death of king August II the exiled former king Stanisław Leszczyński from France to Poland. For this mission he was issued false travel documents and disguised as a Swedish officer Gustav Bartel went to Paris. In Fontainebleau he met Leszczyński and got a promise from him to restore his father Pylyp Orlyk as a hetman of Ukraine in exchange for his services. In Paris he also met Cardinal Flery, the first minister of Louis XV and discussed with him the prospects of Stanisław Leszczyński's restoration in Poland. In 1730 he entered into French diplomatic service and was sent on a secret mission to Istanbul to set up an anti-Russian coalition with the Turks and the Crimean Tatars. Two years later he was dispatched again to Istanbul and from there to the Crimean khan Qaplan I Giray, where he urged Tatars to attack Russia and help him in his cause.

After the death of Polish King August August II in 1733 as per his agreement with the French we brought from Paris to Warsaw Stanisław Leszczyński and a million florins necessary to secure Leszczyński's election with the bribes. On his return to Paris Louis XV rewarded him with a diamond ring and the queen, the daughter of Stanisław Leszczyński gave him her portrait adorned with precious stones. However, in less than 3 years Leszczyński lost the throne of Poland and had to flee to Königsberg, from where Grégoire Orlyk, as he became known, brought him back to France. In 1734 and 1735 he made further trips to Turkey and to Crimea and in 1737 to Sweden fostering the anti-Russian alliance, which in spite of his efforts did not materialize. Louis XV contemplated appointing him French ambassador to Turkey, but under pressure from St. Petersburg he changed his mind. In 1740s Grégoire Orlyk offered to the king an ambitious plan of resettling Ukrainian Cossacks to the Rhine region under French protection, but with Turkey's objections it was dropped too. Later on Orlyk belonged to the special intelligence service of Luis XV – Secret du Roi and went on clandestine missions to many European countries, for which he received numerous praise, including highest decorations from France, Poland and Sweden.

Military leader 

In 1747 through marriage Grégoire Orlyk acquired substantial wealth and bought a colonel's commission in the king's regiment Royal suedois. He fought in the Seven Years' War in Europe, distinguished himself in the battle of Rosbach and the siege of Charleroi. For his exploits in the battle he was given the title of a comte and was promoted to the junior general's rank of Maréchal de camp. In 1759 he commanded an army corps under the marshal of France comte de Broglie and was further promoted to the rank of lieutenant-general. On November 14, 1759, at the battle near German town of Minden he was fatally wounded in the chest and died on the same day.

Legacy 

Upon the death of his father Pylyp Orlyk, Grégoire Orlyk became the unofficial leader of Ukrainian emigrees in Europe. While in France, he met several times  with Voltaire and advised Voltaire on his work History of Charles XII, King of Sweden (1731).

The first biography of Grégoire Orlyk was by the historian Elie Borschak, who published Hryhor Orlyk, France's Cossack General in 1956. This biography contained many interesting and new discoveries about Orlyk. However, this book made the erroneous claim that the Orly commune near Paris was named after Grégoire Orlyk, who had his estate in the area. This is false as the name was in use in Roman times.
 
In 2006 voluminous records of Orlyk's clandestine correspondence with Louis XV within the Secret du Roi were discovered in the French archives and are being studied.

Literature 
 Iryna Dmytrychyn. Grégoire Orlyk – Un Cosaque ukrainien au service de Louis XV. L'Harmattan, Paris. 
 Orest Subtelny. Ukraine. A history. University of Toronto press. 1994. .
 Borschak Е. Hryhor Orlyk, France's Cossack General, Toronto, 1956

References 

French people of Ukrainian descent
French people of Ukrainian-Jewish descent
18th-century French military personnel
18th-century Ukrainian people
Gregoire
1702 births
1759 deaths
People from Chernihiv Oblast
People from the Cossack Hetmanate
Recipients of the Order of the White Eagle (Poland)